Waliur Rahman was an Awami League politician and a former member of parliament for Rangpur-20. He represented Gaibandha.

Career 
Rahman was elected to parliament from Rangpur-20 as an Awami League candidate in 1973. He served in the Constituent Assembly of Bangladesh. He worked as the correspondent of The Daily Ittefaq and was a founder of Gaibandha Press Club. He was member of the National Committee of Awami League.

Death 
Rahman died on 9 May 2020 at his home in Gaibandha following cardiac arrest.

References 

20th-century births
2020 deaths
Awami League politicians
1st Jatiya Sangsad members
People from Gaibandha District